The Likely Lads is a 1976 British comedy film directed by Michael Tuchner, starring James Bolam and Rodney Bewes. It is a spin-off from Whatever Happened to the Likely Lads?, although it shares its title with the earlier 1960s British television series The Likely Lads, of which Whatever was the sequel.

The screenplay is by the scriptwriters of the television show, Dick Clement and Ian La Frenais; and the principal roles of Bob and Terry, as well as those of Bob's wife Thelma and Terry's sister Audrey, are played by the original television cast.

This film was the final screen appearance of Bewes and Bolam together. At the time of the film's release, the two had fallen out over a quarrel involving the press, and never spoke to each other again. Bolam denied there was a rift between the two men when Bewes died in November 2017.

Plot
An opening pre-credits sequence shows the conception of both Lads during a Second World War air raid. After the opening titles the film cuts to Bob and Terry, both aged about thirty, playing football with some boys.

The main plot begins with Bob and Terry's favourite watering hole, the Fat Ox, being demolished. The middle class Bob feels great sentimentality for this loss, whereas the working class Terry, who is now living in a high rise council flat, is more optimistic about the city's redevelopment, pointing out that he now has a "modern kitchen, a lovely view and an inside lavatory". From this establishing sequence the plot unfolds: Terry receives his final divorce decree, freeing him from his wife in West Germany, and is looking forward to a bright future; Bob on the other hand is growing tired of his married life with Thelma, and jaded with his social activities (the two things he boasted about in the television series).

Terry is now in a relationship with Christina (known as "Chris"), a Finnish beauty  who works at the local boutique, of whom Bob is openly envious. Thelma sees this as an opportunity to get Terry married and settled down, thus removing the perceived threat to her marriage to Bob which Terry, as Bob's lifelong best friend, represents. In her pursuit of this, Thelma insists the four of them going away on a caravanning holiday in Northumberland; but while Thelma and Chris enjoy the trip, Bob and Terry do not. They hitch up the caravan, with the girls asleep in it, and set off to drive home. While they are stopped at a set of temporary traffic lights, Thelma and Chris get out and Bob drives away before they can get back in, stranding them in front of the churchgoing congregation of the market town. Not realising they're now alone, Bob and Terry nevertheless pick up Sandra and Glenys, two attractive young female hitch-hikers, before Thelma and Chris catch up with them again.

As a result of the trip, Terry and Chris split up, and Bob and Thelma separate. Bob decides to stay temporarily at Terry's new flat; but Terry (who is not expecting him) is busy seducing Iris, a colleague of Chris, and Bob unwittingly walks in on their lovemaking. Due to a misunderstanding, both Bob and Thelma believe the other is having sexual relations elsewhere, and have a furious argument in the back of Terry's employer's van. Unbeknownst to them, the van's public address system is still switched on as Terry had been advertising the latest washing powder, ExtraLite, broadcasting their argument across the neighbourhood. Terry loses his job because of this incident.

Bob and Terry drive up to Whitley Bay for a weekend break, and take a room in a bed and breakfast. Bob promptly seduces the landlady's daughter, whilst Terry is seduced by the landlady. After hearing noises from her daughter's bedroom the landlady walks in and Bob has to make a quick getaway through the bedroom window. The same then happens to Terry, with the daughter walking in on him in bed with her mother; this time it is Terry who makes a rapid and trouserless departure through the bedroom window. But when the landlady goes down to the front door to let Terry back in, Bob appears instead, without his trousers, causing her to cry rape. The Lads make a hasty—and trouserless—departure in Bob's car. They return to Terry's flat safely only to find Thelma and Terry's sister Audrey there, with neither Bob nor Terry able to explain the absence of their trousers.

Taking Audrey's advice, Terry makes plans to emigrate. He signs on as a deckhand aboard a ship leaving Newcastle docks, and the two lads spend his last night in England drinking on board the ship. Unknown to Bob, Terry decides not to go. He disembarks; but Bob, heavily intoxicated, falls asleep on board, and awakes in a lifeboat to discover the ship has sailed. The last scene in the film has Terry explaining to Thelma that they'll realise Bob is on board by accident and put him off at the first port of call, Bahrain.

Throughout the film Bob's car, the recently introduced Vauxhall Chevette, suffers as much indignity as the human characters, having the wheels stolen, crashed across the carriageway to Terry's horror, an accident with the caravan and while escaping trouserless from the guest house, Terry insists Bob break the window to get in, only for Terry to discover his door wasn't locked, and suggest that Bob should be more careful.

Cast
 Rodney Bewes as Bob Ferris
 James Bolam as Terry Collier
 Brigit Forsyth as Thelma Ferris
 Mary Tamm as Christina
 Sheila Fearn as Audrey Collier
 Zena Walker as Laura
 Anulka Dziubinska as Dawn
 Alun Armstrong as Milkman
 Judy Buxton as Iris
 Vicki Michelle as Glenys
 Penny Irving as Sandy
 Edward Wilson as Les Ferris
 Michelle Newell as Alice Ferris
 Gordon Griffin as Cyril Collier
 Susan Tracy as Edith Collier
 Roger Avon as Joe the Landlord
 Ronald Lacey as Ernie
 Elizabeth Lax as Wendy
 Linda Robson as Marcia
 Ian McDiarmid as Vicar
 Eric Mason as Truck Driver

Production
The film was greenlit by Nat Cohen of EMI Films. Cohen had enjoyed a deal of success making films of popular British TV series. EMI had an arrangement with Thames Television. It was announced in 1975 as part of a slate of films worth £6 million including adaptations of The Likely Lads and The Sweeney plus Aces High, Spanish Fly and Evil Under the Sun.

Locations

The film was made at EMI's Elstree Studios in Hertfordshire and on location on Tyneside, in and around Newcastle and Whitley Bay. Locations used include the Spanish City funfair at Whitley Bay, the Beehive public house, the Coast Road (A1058) flats and Tynemouth Pier.

Terry's fictional employer "Extralite" washing powder, was filmed at Greggs Christon Road Dept, Gosforth
Terry's works depot was filmed at the former George Angus site on the Coast Road, Wallsend. It has since been demolished and B&Q now occupy the site.
Terry's flat was at Taunton Close, Willington Square, Wallsend. This was one of three blocks of flats which were locally referred to as the 'fourteen stories' and stood on the south side of the A1058 'Coast Road' opposite the George Angus engineering works. They were demolished in the 1990s.
The church where Thelma and Chris are abandoned - Corbridge, Northumberland. The road layout is the same, but the road is now a one-way system, and the traffic flow is opposite to that in the film.
The caravan trip takes place across Tyne Bridge and through Rothbury, Northumberland
The caravan site and 'The Beehive' pub - Earsdon, and Whitley Bay Caravan Park near St Mary's Lighthouse. It was known as 'Feathers Caravan Park'
Bob gets some flowers trapped in the bus after Terry does a "voice of above" on him on Market Street in Newcastle upon Tyne (The area is now heavily pedestrianised since the film was made)
The coast - Whitley Bay
Wallsend High Street - where Bob crosses the zebra crossing in front of Terry's van. The Greenwood's store was still there on the corner of Atkinson Terrace until they went into liquidation in 2019.
City Road on the Quayside is where Bob is rescued from the roof of the building.
Borehamwood Library is where Thelma has the brick dropped on her foot. It has since been demolished and replaced with a new building.
 The dual carriageway where Bob and Terry pick up the two hitchhikers and later drive over the central reservation to chase the truck giving Thelma a lift is Hertford Road A414 between Hatfield and roundabout with B155.
 The "Extralite" washing powder demonstration (Radio Free Ferris) sequence was filmed at the junction of Links Drive and Park Crescent, Borehamwood
The Black Horse pub is the Collingwood pub in Jesmond.
 The bed and breakfast, known in the film as Ivanhoe, where they were thrown out of, is on the Links, Whitley Bay. The Briar Dene pub is just visible in the background as they draw up in the car.
The Total petrol station was at the intersection of Harmondsworth Road and Holloway Lane, Hillingdon, London, next to Heathrow Airport. The site is currently owned by Shell.

Release 
The film premiered at the ABC 1 cinema in Newcastle on 8 April 1976, attended by the film's writers & cast, except for James Bolam who was performing on stage at the Mayfair Theatre in London at the time in the play Treats.

Critical reception
Like many film adaptations of British television shows of the 1970s, the film was largely poorly received at the time by the critics. Coventry Evening Telegraph felt the film only "magnified the failings of these situation comedy ideas". Daily Mirror were positive in their review, commenting: "Films based on TV series rarely transfer successfully to the big screen. The Likely Lads is an exception." They praised the film's "warmly-amusing situations", "crisp dialogue" and "real-life characters". Later, in 2004 it received five stars in the Radio Times film guide, and also received good reviews in What's on TV.

The film is rated M in New Zealand for sexual themes, "Suitable for mature audiences 16 years and over."

References

External links

1976 comedy films
British comedy films
Films shot at EMI-Elstree Studios
Films based on television series
Films directed by Michael Tuchner
Films set in apartment buildings
Films set in Newcastle upon Tyne
Films shot in England
EMI Films films
Films with screenplays by Dick Clement
Films with screenplays by Ian La Frenais
1970s English-language films